Stylonematophyceae is a grouping of red algae.

References

External links 
 
 
 Stylonematophyceae at AlgaeBase

 
Red algae classes